Farmingdale is the name of several places in the United States of America:

 Farmingdale, Illinois
 Farmingdale, Maine
 Farmingdale (CDP), Maine
 Farmingdale, New Jersey
 Farmingdale, New York
 Farmingdale (LIRR station)
 Farmingdale, South Dakota